Vigas are wooden beams used in the traditional adobe architecture of the American Southwest, especially New Mexico. In this type of construction, the vigas are the main structural members carrying the weight of the roof to the load-bearing exterior walls. The exposed beam ends projecting from the outside of the wall are a defining characteristic of Pueblo architecture and Spanish Colonial architecture in New Mexico and often replicated in modern Pueblo Revival architecture. Usually the vigas are simply peeled logs with a minimum of woodworking. In traditional buildings, the vigas support latillas (laths) which are placed crosswise and upon which the adobe roof is laid, often with intermediate layers of brush or soil. The latillas may be hewn boards, or in more rustic buildings, simply peeled branches. These building techniques date back to the Ancestral Puebloan peoples, and vigas (or holes left where the vigas have deteriorated) are visible in many of their surviving buildings.

Since the modern Pueblo Revival style was popularized in the 1920s and 1930s, vigas are typically used for ornamental rather than structural purposes. Noted architect John Gaw Meem incorporated ornamental vigas into many of his designs. Contemporary construction in Santa Fe, New Mexico, which is controlled by stringent building codes, typically incorporates ornamental vigas, although the latest revision of the residential building code gives credit for structural vigas. Older structures that have been reconstructed (e.g. the Palace of the Governors in Santa Fe) may contain both structural and ornamental vigas.

Composition
Vigas are typically about 6 to 10 inches (15.24 to 25.4 cm) in diameter and average 15 feet (4.6 m) long and are commonly used in interior spaces. Pinyon (Pinus edulis) and Ponderosa Pine were the most common wood species used in viga construction during the 17th century. Engelmann spruce is the preferred wood "for the wood character and lack of cracking," but Ponderosa pine (Pinus ponderosa) is more commonly used. Wood characteristics, availability of trees, and transportation issues defined room depths that were mostly no longer than 15 feet (4.6 m). A layer of smaller branches or saplings known as latillas or latias (laths) covers the top of the vigas with adobe for insulation and water repellent.

Although in prehistoric times vigas were reused from old constructions to new buildings, such as in Walpi, this practice depended on the history of some sites. In the 19th century, the traditional craftsmanship of vigas changed with the arrival of the railroad in the 1880s and immigrants from the east coast. New dimensioned 2" X 4" (50 mm x 100 mm) lumber was introduced in the area.

Materials
Cutting trees for vigas was usually done in winter because of the good temperatures. “Dead and down” trees were the preferred source for vigas in the adjacent forests. Traditional vigas were usually cut to length with metal axes. Latillas were also collected, along with other construction materials at the same time. To make transportation easier, wood preparation usually was done before shipment. Large labor crews were involved, and vigas were transported from the mountains by teams of oxen. Some construction historians have mentioned the use of latillas under the vigas for carrying poles.

Wood cutting was an important aspect of material production. If cutting was done shorter than needed, the builders had to wait until one year later to get the same material, thus representing a problem. These issues led to some structural and designing decisions in constructions, such as the building of second walls inside the proposed building so shorter materials could be used.

Large diameter vigas were cut first so that they can dry or cure for a longer period. As lighter elements for transportation, latillas or latias were cut last from various wood types. These were then sorted and laid out in different patterns from the vigas and painted in a different colors. The 1846 American immigration brought notions of New England architecture. New technologies substituted the use of vigas for machine-sawn beams, among other construction techniques that followed to the 20th century. This practice did not interfere with the use of vigas for mostly decorative purposes in the Pueblo Revival Style architecture between the 1920s and 1930s.

Structural assembly
Traditional vigas were mostly used for structural purposes in buildings. Vigas were often spaced 3 feet (0.91 m) apart, although irregular or unequal spaced was characteristic of Spanish colonial architecture. Buildings using viga roof construction vary from large institutional buildings to small ones. The amount of vigas used for a room vary, but six was the standard. Some rooms in Acoma are roofed with five to nine vigas. Also, other structural practices were added to later buildings, such as placing horizontal bond beams to transfer structural loads to the adobe roof.

The extension of vigas some feet outside of the wall is a standard practice. This was used for the creation of portales or covered porches. An umbral or lintel was added for support of the viga along with vertical posts in these spaces. The porch's roof treatment was the same as in the interior room, but the space provided was used for different purposes.

Vigas were usually installed with the smaller ends to one side of the roof to facilitate good drainage. Vigas usually sat directly on the adobe or stone walls and were strapped. Decorative corbels were used in the portales and in the interiors.

New technologies, especially in Pueblo Revival Architecture, were integrated. The practice of anchoring Vigas with rebar through pre-drilled holes at opposing angles and the designing of parapets for anchoring, was ideal for vigas in low flat roofs. This was used to prevent roof uplift.

The vaulted viga roof is another type of structural system using vigas, using parapets on the two side and eaves on the ends. The roof is left exposed on the interior and latillas are placed parallel with others in a diagonal pattern.

Examples

Featured buildings

 Acoma Pueblo 
 San Esteban del Rey Mission
 Pueblo del Arroyo Palace of the Governors 
 Taos Pueblo
 Mission Nuestra Señora de los Ángeles de Porciúncula de los Pecos
 Pueblo Bonito 
 La Fonda on the Plaza 
 Taylor Memorial Chapel 
 Cristo Rey Church 
 New Mexico Museum of Art 
 Painted Desert Inn 
 Cabot's Pueblo Museum 
 Hodgin Hall 
 Estufa 
 Chaco Culture National Historical Park
 Salinas Pueblo Missions National Monument 
 Santa Clara Pueblo, New Mexico 
 Mission Nuestra Señora de la Asunción de Zia 
 Kewa Pueblo, New Mexico

See also

Adobe roof
Putlog hole

Notes

References
Bunting, Bainbridge (1983). John Gaw Meem: Southwestern Architect. Albuquerque: University of New Mexico Press. 
Cameron, Catherine M. Architectural change at a Southwestern Pueblo. PhD. Diss., University of Arizona, 1991. 
Dickey, Roland F., and Faris, Tom. "Earth Is Lifted: Domestic Architecture in New Mexico." Southwest Review 33, no. 1 (Winter 1948): 31-37. 
Frederick Gritzner, Charles. Spanish Log Construction in New Mexico. PhD. Diss., Louisiana State University, 1969, 63.
Gleye, Paul. "Santa Fe without Adobe: Lessons for the Identity of Place." Journal of Architectural and Planning Research 11, no. 3 (Autumn 1994): 181-96.
Harris, Cyril M. Dictionary of Architecture & Construction. 4th ed, 1045-1046. New York: McGraw-Hill, 2006.
Hunter, Kaki, and Donald Kiffmeyer. "Roof Systems." In Earthbag Building: The Tools, Tricks and Techniques, 115-18. Gabriola Island: New Society, 2004. 
Knox Wetherington, Ronald. Early Occupations in the Taos District in the Context of Northern Rio Grande Culture History. PhD. Diss., University of Michigan, 1964. 
McAlester, Virginia, Suzanne Patton. Matty, and Steve Clicque. A Field Guide to American Houses: The Definitive Guide to Identifying and Understanding Americas Domestic Architecture, 542-545. New York: Alfred A. Knopf, 2017.

Phillips, Charles, and Alan Axelrod, eds. "Architecture: Adobe Architecture." In Encyclopedia of the American West. USA, 1996.
Riley Bartholomew, Philip. The Hacienda: Its Evolvement and Architecture in Colonial New Mexico 1598-1821. PhD. Diss., University of Missouri-Columbia, 1983. 

Architecture in New Mexico
Spanish-American culture